Manassa Thomas Pope (1858 - November 13, 1934) was an American doctor and businessman who lived in Raleigh, North Carolina.  He had mixed heritage on both parents' sides. His home in Raleigh is listed on the National Register of Historic Places. He was a candidate for mayor of Raleigh in 1919 during the Jim Crow era.

His father was Jonas Elias Pope (1827- 1913), a carpenter who owned land in 
Northampton County and Bertie County, some of it rented to sharecroppers  to grow cotton. His father was a Quaker. Manassa T. Pope was born free. He graduated from Shaw University and then the Leonard Medical Center in 1886.

He married Lydia Walden of 
Winton, North Carolina in 1887. They moved to Henderson, North Carolina in 1888. Pope served there as assistant postmaster, a position achieved by political appointment. He worked in Charlotte and co-founded Queen City Drug Company in 1892 and People's Benevolent Association, an insurance business.

He was an officer and surgeon in the Spanish American War in 1898.

Pope moved to Raleigh in 1899, establishing his doctor's office on Fayetteville Street and later at 13 East Hargett Street. He built his two-story brick home at 511 South Wilmington Street in 1901. The last remaining home from a once segregated neighborhood of middle class African Americans, it is now the M. T. Pope House Museum.

His wife died in 1906 and he married Delia H. Phillips, an educator, the following year. They had two daughters: Evelyn and Ruth who graduated from Columbia University and became teachers.

He helped organize Mechanics and Farmers Bank in Durham, North Carolina.

Facing abuse and discrimination from a rising tide of restrictions from an organized movement for white supremacy, he ran for city council in 1919.

He was a classmate and friend of James H. Young whose regiment he served in.

He was related to Pocahontas Pope and Cleero Pope.

Further reading

References

1858 births
1934 deaths